"Encore une fois" (French for "One More Time") is a song by German DJ group Sash!, released in January 1997 as the second single from their debut album, It's My Life – The Album (1997). It features French vocals by German vocalist Sabine Ohmes and found huge success in clubs throughout the world. To date, it is one of Sash!'s biggest hits. In the UK, it was released in February same year and propelled itself to number two on the UK Singles Chart, quickly earning a Gold certification. Throughout Europe, the track became a top 10 smash in countries such as Belgium, Finland, France, Iceland, Italy, Norway, Spain and Sweden. In Greece and Ireland, the song reached the top of the charts. In the United States, it became a club smash and hit number one on the Billboard Hot Dance Club Play chart, staying on the chart for fourteen weeks.

11 years after it was first released, the song again reached the top 40 in three countries as part of a mashup. The music from Sash!'s hit was combined with the vocals from Stunt's "Raindrops" to create the new track "Raindrops (Encore une fois)".

Release
Two main versions of the song exist. One is the original edit, which was used in the music video and appeared (in extended form) on Sash!'s debut album It's My Life. The second is the Future Breeze edit, which is a much harder version of the track and is the most popular with fans. It appears on Sash!'s best-of albums and as a bonus track (in extended form) on It's My Life – The Album.

When the single was originally released, a pressing-plant error swapped the first two tracks (Original and Future Breeze edits) thus giving the Future Breeze remix accidental success; it therefore became the official version.

Critical reception
Barry Walters for The Advocate said, "Ripping off all those intensely dramatic Rollo mixes for Faithless, Kristine W, and others, that trance track you keep hearing with the girl screaming in French defines clubland à la mode — fabulous now, soon tired." Jon O'Brien from AllMusic noted "the pizzicato sounds" of the song. Chuck Campbell from Knoxville News Sentinel felt that "a smoky undercurrent" on tracks like "Encore Une Fois" "expose the darker side of dance music." British magazine Music Week gave it three out of five, writing, "Topping the import charts and with a buzz on dance radio, this storming floor-filler could well find its way into the Top 40." A reviewer from Smash Hits commented, "Think Faithless' "Insomnia" in a trancey continental style", and remarked that the song is "big on the synth stabs, massive on bangin' 4/4 beats, huge on some husky French bird screaming, "Encore une fois!"."

Chart performance
"Encore une fois" proved to be very successful on the charts globally and remains one of the group's biggest hits. In the United States, it peaked at number-one on the Billboard Hot Dance Club Play chart, staying within the chart for a total of fourteen weeks. In Europe, it peaked at number-one in both Greece and Ireland, as well as on the Eurochart Hot 100, where it peaked in April 1997. The single also made its way to number two in Denmark, Scotland and the United Kingdom. In the latter, it hit that position in its first week at the UK Singles Chart, on February 23, 1997. It was held from reaching the top spot by No Doubt's "Don't Speak". But on the UK Dance Chart, "Encore une fois" hit number-one. It entered the top 10 also in Belgium (5, in both Flanders and Wallonia), Finland (5), France (7), Iceland (5), Italy (4), the Netherlands (9), Norway (4), Spain (5) and Sweden (6). In New Zealand and Australia, the single reached number 34 and 35, respectively.

Music video
The accompanying music video for "Encore une fois" was directed by Oliver Sommer.

Two versions of the video exist, one with the Original Edit and one with the Blunt Radio Edit (an edited version of the Future Breeze Remix). The former can be seen on 10th Anniversary's bonus DVD and the later can be seen on Altra Mode Music's official YouTube channel. By January 2023, the video had generated more than 11 million views.

Track listings

 CD 1
 "Encore une fois" (Original Edit) – 3:38
 "Encore une fois" (Future Breeze Edit) – 3:38
 "Encore une fois" (Future Breeze Mix) – 6:25
 "Encore une fois" (Original 12" Mix) – 6:28
 "Encore une fois" (Merlyn and Chuck Mellom Mix) – 5:50
 "Encore une fois" (La Casa De Tokapi Mix) – 5:19

 CD 2
 "Encore une fois" (Blunt Radio Edit) – 3:49
 "Encore une fois" (Future Breeze) – 6:29
 "Encore une fois" (La Casa Di Tokapi) – 5:22
 "Encore une fois" (Dancing Divas Club Remix) – 7:24
 "Encore une fois" (The Powerplant Remix) – 9:42
 "Encore une fois" (Original 12") – 6:27

Charts

Weekly charts

Year-end charts

References

External links

1996 songs
1997 singles
Sash! songs
French-language songs
Irish Singles Chart number-one singles
Number-one singles in Greece
PolyGram singles
Music videos directed by Oliver Sommer